Jean-Baptiste Regnault (9 October 1754 – 12 November 1829) was a French painter.

Biography
Regnault was born in Paris, and began life at sea in a merchant vessel. At the age of fifteen his talent attracted attention, and he was sent to Italy by M. de Monval under the care of Bardin. After his return to Paris in 1776, Regnault won the Grand Prix for his painting Alexandre and Diogène, and in 1783 he was elected to the French Académie des Beaux-Arts. His diploma picture, The Education of Achilles by Chiron the Centaur, is now in the Louvre, as also are his Trois Grâces, Le Déluge, Descente de croix (Christ taken down from the Cross, originally executed for the royal chapel at Fontainebleau) and Socrate arrachant Alcibiade du sein de la Volupté.

His L'origine de la peinture and L'origine de la sculpture, ou Pygmalion amoureux de sa statue are now at the Palace of Versailles.

Besides various small pictures and allegorical subjects, Regnault was also the author of many large historical paintings; and his school, which reckoned amongst its chief attendants Guérin, Crepin, Lafitte, Blondel, Robert Lefèvre, Henriette Lorimier and Alexandre Menjaud, was for a long while the rival in influence of that of David.

Besides Merry-Joseph Blondel, Pierre-Narcisse Guérin, Robert Lefèvre, and Henriette Lorimier, Jean-Baptiste Regnault's students include: Godefroy Engelmann,  Louis Hersent, Charles Paul Landon, Hippolyte Lecomte, Jacques Réattu, Jean-Hilaire Belloc, Anne Nicole Voullemier.

Jean-Baptiste Regnault was married first to Sophie Meyer, then Sophie Félicité Beaucourt.

He died in Paris. He is buried in Père-Lachaise Cemetery.

Selected works
 Alexandre et Diogène, ou Diogéne Visité par Alexandre (1776)
L'Éducation d'Achille par le centaure Chiron (1782), Musée du Louvre
 L'origine de la peinture (1786), Palace of Versailles 
L'origine de la sculpture, ou Pygmalion amoureux de sa statue (1786), Palace of Versailles 
 Oreste et Iphigénie en Tauride (1787)
 Déscente de Croix (1789), Musée du Louvre
 Le Déluge (1789/91),  Musée du Louvre
 Socrate arrachant Alcibiade des bras de la Volupté (1791), Musée du Louvre
 La Liberté ou la Mort (1795), Kunsthalle Hamburg
 Les Trois Grâces (1799), Musée du Louvre 
Desaix recevant la mort à la bataille de Marengo (1801) 
 Napoléon au camp de Boulogne (1804), Museo Napoleónico (Havana)
La Marche triomphale de Napoléon Ier vers le temple de l'immortalité (1804)
 Mariage du prince Jérôme et de la princesse de Wurtemberg (1810)
 The Judgement of Paris (1812), Detroit Institute of Art, donation from Cristina and Henry Ford II
 La Toilette de Vénus (1815), National Gallery of Victoria
 L'Amour et l'Hymen buvant dans la coupe de l'Amitié (1820), Meaux, Musée Bossuet, gift of Professeur Changeux
 Jupiter et Io (1827), Musée des Beaux-Arts de Brest
 Cupidon et Psyché (1828)

References

External links

 Jean-Baptiste Regnault in Artcyclopedia

1754 births
1829 deaths
Painters from Paris
18th-century French painters
French male painters
19th-century French painters
Prix de Rome for painting
Academic art
Members of the Académie des beaux-arts
Burials at Père Lachaise Cemetery
19th-century French male artists
18th-century French male artists